Vlissingen is a city in Zeeland, Netherlands. 

Vlissingen, Van Vlissingen, or, variation, may also refer to:

Places
 Vlissingen (town), Nieuw Nederland, former name of Flushing (Queens), NYC, NYS, USA
 Vlissingen (river), Nieuw Nederland, former name of Flushing Creek, NYC, NYS, USA
 Nieuw Vlissingen, Nieuw Walcheren, Tobago, West-Indische, a Dutch colonial settlement; former name of Plymouth, Tobago, Trinidad and Tobago

Facilities and structures
 Fort Vlissingen, Wang-an, Penghu, Pescadores Islands; a 17th century fort of the Dutch East India Company
 Vlissingen Naval Base, Vlissingen, Zeeland, Netherlands; a Dutch naval base
 Vlissingen Navy Drydock, Vlissingen, Zeeland, Netherlands; an Admiralty drydock predating the naval base
 Rijkswerf Vlissingen, a shipyard later subsumed into the naval base
 Vlissingen railway station, Vlissingen, Zeeland, Netherlands; a Dutch train station
 Roosendaal–Vlissingen railway, Netherlands

People
 Arthur Van Vlissingen Jr. (1894-1986), a U.S. business writer

Fictional characters
 Miss Vlissingen, a fictional character from the 1939 U.S. film Slightly Honorable

Other uses
 Van Vlissingen and Co. (est 1879), a U.S. real estate developer
 VC Vlissingen, Vlissingen, Zeeland, Netherlands; a Dutch soccer team

See also

 Fentener van Vlissingen, a Dutch mercantile dynasty and family name
 Vlissingen Souburg railway station, Zeeland, Netherlands; a train station on the border with Belgium
 
 Flushing (disambiguation), a word derived from Vlissingen